Arthur Hafford Cooke, MBE (13 December 1912 – 31 July 1987) was an English academic administrator at the University of Oxford.

Cooke was educated at Wyggeston Grammar School and Christ Church, Oxford He became a Research Lecturer at  Christ Church in 1939. During World War Two he conducted Radar research for the Admiralty. He was a Fellow of New College, Oxford, from 1946 to 1976; University Lecturer in Physics from 1944 to 1971; Reader in Physics from 1971 to 1976; and Warden of New College from 1976 to 1985.

References

1912 births
1987 deaths
Wardens of New College, Oxford
People educated at Wyggeston Grammar School for Boys
People from Leicestershire
Members of the Order of the British Empire